The 2017 Conference USA women's basketball tournament was a postseason women's basketball tournament for Conference USA was held March 8–11 in Birmingham, Alabama. The first two rounds took place at Bartow Arena while the semifinals and championship took place at Legacy Arena. WKU won their 2nd C-USA tournament title and earned an automatic trip to the NCAA women's tournament.

Seeds
The top twelve teams qualified for the tournament. Teams were seeded by record within the conference, with a tiebreaker system to seed teams with identical conference records.

Eliminated from Conference tournament: Florida Atlantic, Florida International

Schedule
*Game times in CT. #-Rankings denote tournament seed

Bracket

All times listed are Central

See also
2017 Conference USA men's basketball tournament

References

Conference USA women's basketball tournament
Conference USA women's basketball tournament
Tournament
Conference USA women's basketball tournament